Romolo de Valentibus (died 1579) was a Roman Catholic prelate who served as Bishop of Conversano (1561–1579).

Biography
In 1561, Romolo de Valentibus was appointed during the papacy of Pope Pius IV as Bishop of Conversano.
He served as Bishop of Conversano until his death in 1579.

References 

16th-century Italian Roman Catholic bishops
Bishops appointed by Pope Pius IV
1579 deaths